Mira Eklund (born 13 October 1981) is a Swedish actress.  Her credits include Hotell, Sex hopp & kärlek and the television series Spung, Brandvägg and Love & Anarchy.

See also
Guldbagge Award for Best Actress in a Supporting Role
49th Guldbagge Awards
List of Swedish actors

References

External links 
 

1981 births
Living people
Swedish actresses
Place of birth missing (living people)